The Journal of Endocrinological Investigation is a monthly peer-reviewed medical journal covering endocrinology. It was established in 1978 and is published by Springer Science+Business Media on behalf of the Italian Society of Endocrinology, of which it is the official journal. The editor-in-chief is Luigi Bartalena (University of Insubria). According to the Journal Citation Reports, the journal has a 2017 impact factor of 3.166.

References

External links

Springer Science+Business Media academic journals
Monthly journals
Publications established in 1978
English-language journals
Endocrinology journals
Academic journals associated with learned and professional societies